Chelsea Football Club are an English professional association football club based in Fulham, London. The club was established in 1905 and plays its home games at Stamford Bridge.

Domestically, Chelsea have won six top-flight titles, eight FA Cups and five League Cups. In international competitions, they have won two UEFA Champions League titles, two UEFA Europa Leagues, two UEFA Cup Winners' Cups, two UEFA Super Cups and one FIFA Club World Cup. They were the first English club to win all four European trophies and are the only London club to win the UEFA Champions League. The club's record appearance maker is Ron Harris, who made 795 appearances between 1961 and 1980. Frank Lampard is Chelsea's record goalscorer, scoring 211 goals in total.

Honours

The first major trophy won by Chelsea came in 1955, when the team became national champions after winning the 1954–55 First Division title. In the 2009–10 season, Chelsea won their first and only double after winning both the Premier League and the FA Cup. Upon winning the 2012–13 UEFA Europa League, Chelsea became the fourth club in history to have won the "European Treble" of European Cup/UEFA Champions League, European Cup Winners' Cup/UEFA Cup Winners' Cup, and UEFA Cup/UEFA Europa League. Their most recent success came in February 2022, when they won their first FIFA Club World Cup title.

Players

Appearances
Most appearances in all competitions: 795, Ron Harris (1961–1980)
Most league appearances: 655, Ron Harris (1961–1980)
Most FA Cup appearances: 64, Ron Harris (1961–1980)
Most League Cup appearances: 48, John Hollins (1963–1975 and 1983–1984) and Ron Harris (1961–1980)
Most appearances in UEFA competitions: 124, John Terry (1998–2015)
Most consecutive appearances: 167, John Hollins, 14 August 1971 – 25 September 1974
Most consecutive league appearances: 164, Frank Lampard, 13 October 2001 – 26 December 2005
Most appearances in a single season: 64, Juan Mata, Oscar and Fernando Torres, 2012–13
Most international caps while a Chelsea player: Frank Lampard, 104 for England
First Chelsea player to play for England: George Hilsdon, 16 February 1907
First Chelsea player to play for England at a World Cup: Roy Bentley, 1950 World Cup, 25 June 1950
First foreign (non-UK) player: Nils Middelboe (Denmark), 15 November 1913
Youngest player: Ian Hamilton, 16 years 138 days, vs. Tottenham Hotspur, First Division, 18 March 1967
Oldest player: Mark Schwarzer, 41 years and 218 days, vs. Cardiff City, Premier League, 11 May 2014
First substitute: John Boyle, who replaced George Graham vs. Fulham, First Division, 28 August 1965

Most appearances
Competitive matches only. All current players are in bold. Statistics correct as of 18 February 2023.

1 The "Other" column includes appearances in Charity/Community Shield, Football League play-offs, Full Members' Cup, UEFA Super Cup, and FIFA Club World Cup.

Goalscorers

Most goals in all competitions: 211, Frank Lampard (2001–2014)
Most goals in a season: 43, Jimmy Greaves (First Division, 1960–61)
Most goals in one match: 6, George Hilsdon v. Worksop Town, FA Cup, first round, 11 January 1908
Most goals in one final: 3, David Speedie v. Manchester City, Full Members' Cup final, 23 March 1986
Most league goals: 164, Bobby Tambling (1959–1970)
Most league goals in a season: 41, Jimmy Greaves, (First Division, 1960–61)
Most times top goalscorer: 8, Roy Bentley
Most league goals in one match:
5, George Hilsdon v. Glossop, Second Division, 1 September 1906
5, Jimmy Greaves v. Wolverhampton Wanderers, First Division, 30 August 1958
5, Jimmy Greaves v. Preston North End, First Division, 19 December 1959
5, Jimmy Greaves v. West Bromwich Albion, First Division, 3 December 1960
5, Bobby Tambling v. Aston Villa, First Division, 17 September 1966
5, Gordon Durie v. Walsall, Second Division, 4 February 1989
Most Premier League/First Division goals: 147, Frank Lampard (2001–2014)
Most Premier League goals in a season: 29, Didier Drogba (2009–10)
Most Premier League goals in one match:
4, Gianluca Vialli v. Barnsley, Premier League, 24 August 1997
4, Jimmy Floyd Hasselbaink v. Coventry City, Premier League, 21 October 2000
4, Frank Lampard v. Derby County, Premier League, 12 March 2008
4, Frank Lampard v. Aston Villa, Premier League, 27 March 2010
Most FA Cup goals: 26, Frank Lampard (2001–2014)
Most FA Cup goals in a season: 8, Peter Osgood, (1969–70)
Most FA Cup goals in one match: 6, George Hilsdon v. Worksop Town, FA Cup, first round, 11 January 1908
Most FA Cup Final goals: 4, Didier Drogba (2004–2012, 2014–15)
Most League Cup goals: 25, Kerry Dixon (1983–1992)
Most League Cup goals in a season: 8, Kerry Dixon, (1984–85)
Most League Cup goals in one match: 4, Kerry Dixon v. Gillingham, League Cup, first round (first leg), 13 September 1983
Most League Cup Final goals: 4, Didier Drogba (2004–2012, 2014–15)
Most Cup Final goals: 9, Didier Drogba (2004–2012, 2014–15)
Most European goals: 36, Didier Drogba (2004–2012, 2014–15)
Most European goals in a season: 11, Olivier Giroud (2018–19 UEFA Europa League)
Most European goals in one match: 5, Peter Osgood v. Jeunesse Hautcharage, UEFA Cup Winners' Cup, first round (second leg), 29 September 1971
Most hat-tricks: 13, Jimmy Greaves, (1957–1961)
Most international goals while a Chelsea player: Didier Drogba, 45 for Ivory Coast
Oldest goalscorer: Dick Spence, 38 years 282 days v. Wolverhampton Wanderers, First Division, 26 April 1947
Youngest goalscorer: Ian Hamilton, 16 years 138 days v. Tottenham Hotspur, First Division, 18 March 1967
Fastest goalscorer: 12 seconds, Keith Weller v. Middlesbrough, League Cup, 7 October 1970
Most different goalscorers in a season: 21 (during the 2021–22 season)

Overall scorers
Competitive matches only. Appearances in parenthesis.

1 The "Other" column includes goals in Charity/Community Shield, Football League play-offs, Full Members' Cup, UEFA Super Cup, and FIFA Club World Cup.

Award winners

Football Writers' Association Footballer of the Year

The following players have won the Football Writers' Association Footballer of the Year award while playing for Chelsea:
 Gianfranco Zola – 1996–97
 Frank Lampard – 2004–05
 Eden Hazard – 2014–15
 N'Golo Kante – 2016–17

PFA Players' Player of the Year

The following players have won the PFA Players' Player of the Year award while playing for Chelsea:
 John Terry – 2004–05
 Eden Hazard – 2014–15
 N'Golo Kante – 2016–17

Premier League Player of the Season

The following players have won the Premier League Player of the Season award while playing for Chelsea:
 Frank Lampard – 2004–05
 Eden Hazard – 2014–15
 N'Golo Kante – 2016–17

Premier League Golden Boot

The following players have won the Premier League Golden Boot award while playing for Chelsea:
 Jimmy Floyd Hasselbaink – 2000–01
 Didier Drogba – 2006–07
 Nicolas Anelka – 2008–09
 Didier Drogba – 2009–10

Premier League Golden Glove

The following goalkeepers have won the Premier League Golden Glove award while playing for Chelsea:
 Petr Čech – 2004–05
 Petr Čech – 2009–10
 Petr Čech – 2013–14
 Thibaut Courtois – 2016–17

Transfers

Highest transfer fees paid

Highest transfer fees received

Managerial records

 First full-time manager: John Tait Robertson, from August 1905 to November 1906
 First foreign (non-UK) manager: Ruud Gullit (Netherlands), from 10 May 1996 to 12 February 1998
 Longest-serving manager: David Calderhead –  (1 August 1907 to 8 May 1933)
 Most successful manager: José Mourinho (won eight trophies in two spells as manager, 2004–2007 and 2013–2015)
 Highest win percentage (excluding caretakers): Guus Hiddink, 74%
 Lowest win percentage (excluding caretakers): Danny Blanchflower, 16%

Club records

Attendances

 Highest home attendance (estimate): 100,000, against Dynamo Moscow, 13 November 1945
 Highest home attendance (official): 82,905, against Arsenal, First Division, 12 October 1935
 Highest home attendance (Second Division): 67,000, against Manchester United, 13 April 1906
 Highest home attendance (FA Cup): 77,952, against Swindon Town, 13 March 1911
 Highest home attendance (League Cup): 43,330, against Tottenham Hotspur, 22 December 1971
 Highest home attendance (Europe): 59,541, against Milan, 16 February 1966
 Highest season home aggregate: 1,014,352 (1954–55 season)
 Highest league home average: 48,302 (1954–55 season)
 Highest attendance for any Chelsea match: 105,826, against Real Madrid, Michigan Stadium, United States, 30 July 2016
 Highest away attendance: 98,436, against Barcelona, UEFA Champions League Round of 16 second leg, 7 March 2006
 Lowest home attendance: 3,000, against Lincoln City, Second Division, 17 February 1906
 Highest average attendance in English football: 1907–08, 1909–10, 1911–12, 1912–13, 1913–14, 1919–20, 1921–22, 1923–24, 1925–26, 1954–55

Source: Chelsea F.C. official website

Firsts
First match: Chelsea v. Stockport County, Second Division, 2 September 1905
First win: Chelsea v. Liverpool, friendly match, 4 September 1905
First competitive goalscorer: John Robertson, v. Blackpool, Second Division, 9 September 1905
First FA Cup match: Chelsea v. First Grenadier Guards, first qualifying round, 7 October 1905
First FA Cup match (proper): Chelsea v. Lincoln City, first round, 12 January 1907
First League Cup match: Chelsea v. Millwall, first round, 10 October 1960
First European match: Chelsea v. BK Frem, Inter-Cities Fairs Cup, 30 September 1958
First Cup Winners' Cup match: Chelsea v. Aris, first round, 16 September 1970
First UEFA Champions League match: Chelsea v. Skonto Riga, third qualifying round, 11 August 1999
First UEFA Champions League match (proper): Chelsea v. Milan, first group stage, 15 September 1999
First FA Cup winners at the new Wembley Stadium: Chelsea v. Manchester United, 2007 FA Cup Final, 19 May 2007
First domestic double: Chelsea v. Portsmouth, 2010 FA Cup Final, 15 May 2010 (also winning the 2009–10 Premier League)
The first team to score 100 Premier League goals in a season: 2009–10 Premier League season
The first English team to qualify for the UEFA European Cup, winning the 1954–55 First Division (Chelsea were not allowed to participate by the Football Association)
The first London based team to win the UEFA Champions League: 2011–12 season
The first UEFA Champions League title holders to get knocked out in the group stage the following year: 2012–13 season
The first English team to win all three major UEFA competitions
The first UEFA Champions League title holders to win the UEFA Cup/UEFA Europa League the following year: 2012–13 season
The first team in history of the European competitions to be holders of the UEFA Champions League and the UEFA Europa League at the same time (winning the 2013 UEFA Europa League Final on 15 May 2013, and still being holders of the 2011–12 UEFA Champions League until 25 May 2013)
The first team to go 18 successive UEFA Europa League matches without defeat since the competition was rebranded in 2009–10
The first team in Premier League history to have two different hat-trick scorers in a single campaign aged 21 or under
The first top-flight team in history to win 30 games in a 38-game season: 2016–17 Premier League season
The first team to win 15 away matches in a Premier League season: 2004–05 season
The first team to win 18 home matches in a Premier League season: 2004–05 season
The first team to win against every other team at least once in a Premier League season: 2005–06 season

Results

Wins
Record win: 13–0 v. Jeunesse Hautcharage, 1971–72 European Cup Winners' Cup, 29 September 1971
Record league win: 8–0 v. Wigan Athletic, Premier League, 9 May 2010 and 8–0 v. Aston Villa, Premier League, 23 December 2012
Record FA Cup win: 9–1 v. Worksop Town, first round, 11 January 1908
Record League Cup win: 7–0 v. Doncaster Rovers, third round, 16 November 1960
Record European win: 13–0 v. Jeunesse Hautcharage, 1971–72 European Cup Winners' Cup, 29 September 1971
Record European win (away): 0–8 v. Jeunesse Hautcharage, 1971–72 European Cup Winners' Cup, 15 September 1971
Record Champions League win (home): 6–0 v. Maribor on 21 October 2014 and v. Qarabağ on 12 September 2017
Record Champions League win (away): 0–5 v. Galatasaray on 20 October 1999 and v. Schalke 04 on 25 November 2014
Most consecutive league wins: 13, 1 October 2016 – 31 December 2016
Longest sequence without a league win: 21, 3 November 1987 – 2 April 1988
Most league wins in a season: 30 in 38 matches, Premier League, 2016–17
Fewest league wins in a season: 5 in 42 matches, First Division, 1978–79

Draws
Highest scoring draw: 5–5
Bolton Wanderers v. Chelsea, 30 October 1937, First Division
Chelsea v. West Ham United, 17 December 1966, First Division
Most league draws in a season: 18 in 42 matches, First Division, 1922–23
Longest sequence of league draws: 6, 20 August 1969 – 13 September 1969

Unbeaten
Longest sequence of unbeaten matches: 
21, 10 June 2004 – 11 September 2004
23, 23 January 2007 – 13 April 2007
23, 4 April 2009 – 23 September 2009
23, 4 May 2014 – 6 December 2014
Longest sequence of unbeaten league matches: 40, 23 October 2004 – 29 October 2005
Longest sequence of unbeaten home matches in Premier League: 86, 20 March 2004 – 26 October 2008

Losses
Record defeat: 1–8 v. Wolverhampton Wanderers, First Division, 26 September 1953
Record Premier League defeat: 0–6 v. Manchester City, 10 February 2019
Record FA Cup defeat:
1–7 v. Crystal Palace, third qualifying round, 18 November 1905
0–6 v. Sheffield Wednesday, second round replay, 5 February 1913
Record League Cup defeat: 2–6 v. Stoke City, third round replay, 22 October 1974
Record European defeat: 0–5 v. Barcelona, Inter-Cities Fairs Cup, semi-final replay, 25 May 1966
Record Champions League defeat: 1–5 (after extra time) v. Barcelona, quarter-final second leg, 18 April 2000
Longest sequence of league defeats: 7, 1 November 1952 – 20 December 1952
Most league defeats in a season: 27 in 42 matches, First Division, 1978–79
Fewest league defeats in a season: 1 in 38 matches, Premier League, 2004–05

Goals
Most goals scored in one match: 13 v. Jeunesse Hautcharage, 1971–72 UEFA Cup Winners' Cup, 29 September 1971
Most goals conceded in one match: 8 v. Wolverhampton Wanderers, First Division, 26 September 1953
Most league goals scored in one season: 103 in 38 matches, Premier League, 2009–10
Fewest league goals scored in one season: 31 in 42 matches, First Division, 1923–24
Most league goals conceded in one season: 100 in 42 matches, First Division, 1960–61
Fewest league goals conceded in one season: 15 in 38 matches, Premier League, 2004–05
Fewest league goals conceded at home in one season: 6 in 19 matches, Premier League, 2004–05
Fewest league goals conceded away in one season: 9 in 19 matches, Premier League, 2004–05
Most goal scorers in a single game (league): 7 v. Aston Villa, Premier League, 23 December 2012

Points
Most points earned in a season (3 for a win): 99 in 46 matches, Second Division, 1988–89
Fewest points earned in a season (3 for a win): 42 in 40 matches, First Division, 1987–88
Most points earned in a season (2 for a win): 57 in 38 matches, Second Division, 1906–07
Fewest points earned in a season (2 for a win): 20 in 42 matches, First Division, 1978–79

Clean sheets
Most clean sheets in one season: 34 in 59 matches, 2004–05
Fewest clean sheets in one season: 2 in 47 matches, 1960–61
Most league clean sheets in one season: 25 in 38 matches, Premier League, 2004–05
Fewest league clean sheets in one season: 1 in 42 matches, First Division, 1960–61
Longest run without a clean sheet: 31 games, November 1960 – August 1961
Most consecutive league clean sheets during a season: 10, 18 December 2004 – 12 February 2005
Most clean sheets by an individual goalkeeper: 228, Petr Čech (2004–2015)
Most clean sheets by an individual goalkeeper in one season: 28, Petr Čech, 2004–05
Most Premier League clean sheets by an individual goalkeeper in one season: 24, Petr Čech, 2004–05
Most consecutive clean sheets by an individual goalkeeper: 9, William Foulke, 1905–06
Most overall clean sheets in Premier League: 162, Petr Čech (2004–2015)

Penalties
Most penalties saved: 9, Reg Matthews
Most penalties scored by a single player: 49, Frank Lampard

National/European records
Fewest goals conceded in a league season: 15 in 38 matches, Premier League, 2004–05 (English top flight record)
Fewest goals conceded away in a league season: 9 in 18 matches, Premier League, 2004–05 (English top flight record)
Most consecutive clean sheets at the start of a season: 6, 14 August 2005 – 17 September 2005 (English top flight record)
Longest sequence of unbeaten home league matches: 86, 21 February 2004 – 26 October 2008 (English record)
Most clean sheets in a season: 25, 2004–05 (Premier League record)
Most goals scored at home in a league season: 68, 2009–10 (Premier League record)
Most consecutive league away wins: 11, 5 April 2008 – 22 December 2008 (Premier League joint record)
Most home wins in a league season: 18, 2005–06 (Premier League joint record)
Fewest home draws in a league season: 0, 2016–17 (Premier League joint record)
Most consecutive wins from start of a season: 9, 2005–06 (Premier League record)
Most days spent in first place in a season: 274 days, 2014–15 (Premier League record)
Fewest goals conceded for a team winning the Champions League: 4 in 13 games, 2020–21 (European record)
Highest aggregate scoreline in European competition: 21–0, v Jeunesse Hautcharage, 1971–72 European Cup Winners' Cup, 29 September 1971 (joint record)
Fewest goals conceded in a Champions League group stage campaign: 1, 2005–06 (joint record)
Most Champions League games played in the knockout phase by an English club: 75 matches
Most Champions League round of 16 appearances by an English club: 17 appearances
Most Champions League round of 16 aggregate wins by an English club: 11 wins
Most Champions League quarter-final aggregate wins by an English club: 8 wins
Most Champions League semi-finals appearances by an English club: 8 appearances
Most consecutive Europa League matches without defeat: 18 matches
Only team to score at least 4 goals in a Europa League final
Longest unbeaten run in the FA Cup: 29 matches (excluding penalty shoot-outs)

See also
 Chelsea F.C. in international football
 List of Chelsea F.C. managers

References
General

Specific

Chelsea
Records and Statistics